Hypolycaena buxtoni, the Buxton's hairstreak, is a butterfly of the family Lycaenidae. It is found in southern Africa.

The wingspan is 25–30 mm for males and 28–33 mm for females. Adults are on wing from September to May (with a peak in October and November) and from February to May (with a peak in March and April). There are two generations per year.

The larvae feed on Tricalysia and Pavetta species and possibly Tarenna pavettoides.

Subspecies
Hypolycaena buxtoni buxtoni (Cape, KwaZulu-Natal, Zimbabwe, Malawi)
Hypolycaena buxtoni rogersi Bethune-Baker, 1924 (the coast of eastern Kenya and eastern Tanzania)
Hypolycaena buxtoni spurcus Talbot, 1929 (Zambia, southern Zaire (Shaba), south-western Tanzania)

References

External links

Die Gross-Schmetterlinge der Erde 13: Die Afrikanischen Tagfalter. Plate XIII 67 b

Butterflies described in 1874
Hypolycaenini
Butterflies of Africa
Taxa named by William Chapman Hewitson